The 1976 Argentine coup d'état that overthrew Isabel Perón as President of Argentina on 24 March 1976, while having some right-wing elements, such as its emphasis on order and security, was not a traditional right-wing coup and did not adhere to a specific ideology. A military junta was installed to replace her; this was headed by Lieutenant General Jorge Rafael Videla, Admiral Emilio Eduardo Massera and Brigadier-General Orlando Ramón Agosti. The political process initiated on 24 March 1976 took the official name of "National Reorganization Process", and the junta, although not with its original members, remained in power until the return to the democratic process on 10 December 1983.

The military coup had been planned since October 1975, the Peron government learned of the preparations two months before its execution. Henry Kissinger met several times with Argentine Armed Forces leaders after the coup, urging them to destroy their opponents quickly before outcry over human rights abuses grew in the United States.

Given the systematic persecution of a social minority, the period has been classified as a genocidal process. This has been established in the sentences of the trials of the perpetrators for crimes against humanity.

Prelude to the coup 
When president Juan Perón died of natural causes on 1 July 1974, he was succeeded by his wife (then vice-president) Isabel Perón, also known as "Isabelita." Despite her claim as the country's rightful ruler, she rapidly lost political gravitas and power. A group of military officials, tasked by Perón to aide the vice-president, took control in an effort to revitalize Argentina's deteriorating political and social climate. This shift in governance paved the way for the ensuing coup.

On 5 February 1975 Operativo Independencia was launched. This Vietnam-style intervention aimed to eliminate the guerrillas in the Tucumán jungle, who had maintained strongholds in the area as early as May 1974. In October the country was divided into five military zones, with each commander given full autonomy to unleash a carefully planned wave of repression.

On 18 December, a number of warplanes took off from Morón Air Base and strafed the Casa Rosada in an attempt to overthrow Isabel Perón. The rebellion was brought to a halt four days later through arbitration by a chaplain.

However, the military did succeed in removing the only officer remaining loyal to the government, Air Force commander Héctor Fautario. Fautario drew harsh criticism from the Army and Navy owing to his vehement opposition to their repressive plans, and for his refusal to mobilize the Air Force against the guerrillas' strongholds in the north. Fautario was Videla's final obstacle in his pursuit of power.

By January 1976 the guerrilla presence in Tucumán had been reduced to a few platoons. Meanwhile, the military, fully backed by the local élite, along with Chilean strongman Augusto Pinochet, the United States Central Intelligence Agency (CIA), and the administration of President Gerald Ford, bided its time before ultimately seizing power.

Isabela Peron's loss of legitimacy 
Peron's loss of power, besides the public ridicule, was magnified by the loss of her congressional majority. In addition, her popular support was reduced to a right wing section of Peronism. By February 1976, three service commanders had requested that she resign from the presidency. Another issue with Peron’s presidency was the ongoing terrorism problem. Throughout her presidency Peron struggled against  both the Montonero and Peoples Revolutionary Army (ERP) left wing terrorists as well as the right wing Alianza Anticomunista Argentina group(AAA), with a clear example being the 25 political murders between March 20 and 21st 1975, which had victims on both the left and right wing. Only in late May of 1975 did her Social Welfare minister, Lopez Rega announce an investigation of the AAA group, though the group had been active for 550 days without a single arrest. As the government finally addressed the AAA, it indicated public dissatisfaction with the current regime’s treatment over the AAA. By late may 1976, local press was open reporting on a coup happening within hours, which led to ramped up political violence between left and right, as those were interested in “settling scores” which led to about 165 people killed from the start of the year until then, of which the Peron regime was powerless to stop.

The coup 
Shortly before 01:00 am, President Perón was detained and taken by helicopter to the El Messidor residence. At 03:10 all television and radio stations were interrupted. Regular transmissions were cut and replaced by a military march, after which the first communiqué was broadcast:

A state of siege and martial law were implemented, as military patrolling spread to every major city. The morning was seemingly uneventful, but as the day progressed, the detentions multiplied. Hundreds of workers, unionists, students, and political activists were abducted from their homes, their workplaces, or in the streets.

Media Coverage of the coup 
At the end of the day on March 24th, the Clarin newspaper had released a second publication detailing the new government takeover, confirming that between 3:10 and 3:15, that the military had taken over the government, replacing Isabela Peron. The paper's front page also declared the military’s  reason to replace Peron in order to not create a power vacuum. In the coming days, the Clarin continued to publish parallel to new developments, but by March 28th the paper was beginning to shift away from coverage of the coup. Additionally, the Clarin also released the names of the new cabinet members under Jorge Videla, those being Albano Harguindeguy, Ricardo Franke, Julio Gomez, Osvaldo Cacciatore, Jose A. Martinez de Hoz, Ricardo Bruera, Horacio Liendo, and Julio J. Bardi, all high ranking military officers of some kind. On the release of the March 28th publication, the newspaper also explained that the Junta had been recognized by thirty two countries already as the government of Argentina.

Censorship and Bias in the media 
Under Isabela Peron’s presidency, media coverage was severely restricted, applying to both local press as well as foreign press coverage of Argentina. Under Peron, several decrees were released, one being a news agency registry, and the requirement that all local as well as foreign news outlets follow all the guidelines, the main one being that “domestic and foreign news media are forbidden to carry news about argentina supplied by foreign news agencies” through decree 1273. Several newspapers, such as La Prensa and La Opinion immediately spoke out against the restrictions, condemning them, and explaining how they are “ambiguous, arbitrary, and absurd”. These same newspapers were punished by having their government funding suspended. Under the Military government, media coverage was also restricted, with the Junta exercising control over the media. The difference between the two regimes was in the message, however. When the foreign media representatives met with the interim Junta press secretary, Jorge Luis Argiotti, in which he requested “collaboration when reporting matters other than material contained in the communique”, which some foreign media outlets took as implicit control over the media. All the same, radio and television in Argentina strictly broadcast Junta communiques, but foreign news reporters still had access to international news as of March 1976.

Subsequent events

The Junta assumed the executive power until 29 March when Videla was designated president. Congress was disbanded with senators, deputies and staff members being  arrested, brutally beaten and thrown out of doors and windows of the Congressional Palace. An entity known as Legislative Advising Commission (in Spanish: Comision de Asesoramiento Legislativo - CAL), composed entirely of officers from the military and police, assumed a Legislative role.

Human rights activists state that in the aftermath of the coup and ensuing Dirty War, some 30,000 people, primarily young opponents of the military regime, were "disappeared" or killed. Military men responsible for the killings often spared pregnant women for a time, keeping them in custody until they gave birth, before killing them and giving their infants to childless military families. Kissinger privately assured the military regime that they would have the full support of the United States government in their war and associated actions, a promise that was opposed by the U.S. Ambassador to Argentina at the time, Robert Hill.

The dictatorship counted on the complicity of civil and ecclesiastical sectors, therefore it is usually characterized as a civic-military-ecclesiastical-business dictatorship.

The Junta remained in power until the democratic election of Raúl Alfonsín as the President of Argentina, in December 1983.

The 24 March anniversary of the coup is now designated in Argentina as the Day of Remembrance for Truth and Justice.

US interest in regime change 
The American government paid close attention to any changes in regime in Latin America, and had been carefully watching Argentina throughout Peron's presidency. Terrorism under Peron’s presidency had resulted in serious political violence, as well as the murder of John Egan, a US consular to Cordoba, by the Montoneros, which contributed to a feeling of insecurity among Americans in Argentina, as well as the possibility of Americans being the target of terrorism. The American government also had predicted a possible regime change as Peron’s regime began to lose political power, noting that in February 1976 the military “dissatisfaction is so pervasive and intense that one [a coup] could occur at any time”. Another worry with a possible regime change from the US was the protection of US interests, those being economic investments in Argentina, from Ford and General Motors to Exxon industrial centers, but those in the US State Department were not worried about major fundamental changes, citing that left wing groups did not have enough support for a coup and the military was not interested in making sweeping reforms.

See also
 1973 Chilean coup d'état
 United States involvement in regime change in Latin America
 United States involvement in regime change
 Latin America–United States relations

References

External links 

 Argentina Declassification Project: History
 Argentina's Military Coup of 1976: What the US Knew

Argentina
Coup d'état
Argentine coup d'état
March 1976 events in South America
Military coups in Argentina
National Reorganization Process